Szeged (see also other alternative names) is the third largest city of Hungary, the largest city and regional centre of the Southern Great Plain and the county seat of Csongrád-Csanád county. The University of Szeged is one of the most distinguished universities in Hungary.

The Szeged Open Air (Theatre) Festival (first held in 1931) is one of the main attractions, held every summer and celebrated as the Day of the City on 21 May.

Etymology 
The name Szeged might come from an old Hungarian word for 'corner', pointing to the turn of the river Tisza that flows through the city. Others say it derives from the Hungarian word  which means 'island'. Others still contend that  means 'dark blond' – a reference to the color of the water where the rivers Tisza and Maros merge.

History 

Szeged and its area have been inhabited since ancient times. Ptolemy mentions the oldest known name of the city: Partiscum (Ancient Greek: Πάρτισκον). It is possible that Attila, king of the Huns had his seat somewhere in this area. The name Szeged was first mentioned in 1183, in a document of King Béla III.

In the second century AD there was a Roman trading post established on an island in the Tisza, and the foundations of the Szeged castle suggest that the structure may have been built over an even earlier fort. Today only one corner of the castle still remains standing.

During the Mongol invasion the town was destroyed and its inhabitants fled to the nearby swamps, but they soon returned and rebuilt their town. In the 14th century, during the reign of Louis the Great, Szeged became the most important town of Southern Hungary, and – as the Turkish armies got closer to Hungary – the strategic importance of Szeged grew. King Sigismund of Luxembourg had a wall built around the town. Szeged was raised to free royal town status in 1498.

Szeged was first pillaged by the Ottoman Army on 28 September 1526, but was occupied only in 1543, and became an administrative centre of the Ottomans (see Ottoman Hungary). The town was a sanjak centre first in Budin Eyaleti (1543–1596), after in Eğri Eyaleti. The town was freed from Turkish rule on 23 October 1686, and regained the free royal town status in 1715. In 1719, Szeged received its coat of arms (still used today) from Charles III. During the next several years, Szeged grew and prospered. Piarist monks arrived in Szeged in 1719 and opened a new grammar school in 1721. Szeged also held scientific lectures and theatrical plays. These years brought not only prosperity but also enlightenment. Between 1728 and 1744 witch trials were frequent in the town, with the Szeged witch trials of 1728–29 perhaps being the largest. The witch trials were instigated by the authorities, who decided on this measure to remove the problem of the public complaints about the drought and its consequences of famine and epidemics by laying the responsibility on people among them, which had fraternized with the Devil.  In 1720, the ethnic Hungarian population of the town numbered about 13000 to 16000, while the number of the Serb inhabitants was 1300.

Szeged is known as the home of paprika, a spice made from dried, powdered capsicum fruits. Paprika arrived in Hungary in the second half of the 16th century as an ornamental plant. About 100 years later the plant was cultivated as an herb, and paprika as we know it. Szeged is also famous for their szekelygulyas, a goulash made with pork, sauerkraut and sour cream. And also famous for their halászlé, fish soup made of carp and catfish.

The citizens of Szeged played an important part in the Hungarian Revolution of 1848. Lajos Kossuth delivered his famous speech here. Szeged was the last seat of the revolutionary government in July 1849. The Habsburg rulers punished the leaders of the town, but later Szeged began to prosper again; the railway reached it in 1854, and the town got its free royal town status back in 1860. Mark Pick's shop – the predecessor of today's Pick Salami Factory – was opened in 1869.

Today the inner city of Szeged has wide avenues. This is mainly due to the great flood of 1879, which wiped away the whole town (only 265 of the 5723 houses remained and 165 people died). Emperor Franz Joseph visited the town and promised that "Szeged will be more beautiful than it used to be". He kept his promise, and during the next years a new, modern city emerged from the ruins, with palaces and wide streets.

During the 20th century

After the First World War Hungary lost its southern territories to Serbia, as a result Szeged became a city close to the border, and its importance lessened, but as it took over roles that formerly belonged to the now lost cities, it slowly recovered. Following the Loss of Transylvania to Romania, University of Kolozsvár (now Cluj-Napoca), moved to Szeged in 1921 (see University of Szeged). In 1923 Szeged took over the role of episcopal seat from Temesvár (now Timișoara, Romania). It was briefly occupied by the Romanian army during Hungarian-Romanian War in 1919. It also became a center for right-wing forces which would install Miklós Horthy as the country's new leader after the overthrow of the Hungarian Soviet Republic. During the 1920s the Jewish population of Szeged grew and reached its zenith.

Szeged suffered heavily during World War II. 6,000 inhabitants of the city were killed, In 1941, there were 4,161 Jews living in Szeged. After, March 19, 1944 German occupation, they were confined to a ghetto together with the Jews from surrounding villages. In June, 1944, the ghetto was liquidated. The Nazis murdered the larger part of the 8,500 and some were forced into forced labor in Strasshof Labor camp, Austria. Szeged was captured by Soviet troops of the 2nd Ukrainian Front on 11 October 1944 in the course of the Battle of Debrecen. During the communist era, Szeged became a centre of light industry and food industry. In 1965, oil was found near the city.

In 1962, Szeged became the county seat of Csongrád. Whole new districts were built, and many nearby villages (e.g. Tápé, Szőreg, Kiskundorozsma, Szentmihálytelek, Gyálarét) were annexed to the city in 1973 (as was a tendency during the Communist era).

Today's Szeged is an important university town and a tourist attraction.

The Szeged Symphony Orchestra (Szegedi Szimfonikus Zenekar) gives regular concerts at the Szegedi Nemzeti Színház.

Geography
Szeged is situated near the southern border of Hungary, just to the south of the mouth of the Maros River, on both banks of the Tisza River, nearly in the centre of the Carpathian Basin. The Hungarian frontier with Serbia is just outside the town.

Climate
Szeged's climate is transitional between oceanic Köppen "Cfb" (Marine West Coast Climate/Oceanic climate) and continental (Köppen Dfb), with cold winters, hot summers, and fairly low precipitation. Due to the high hours of sunlight reported annually, Szeged is often called City of Sunshine.

Education 

The city of Szeged has 62 kindergartens, 32 elementary schools and 18 high schools. The two most prominent high schools (Ságvári Endre Gyakorló Gimnázium and Radnóti Miklós Kísérleti Gimnázium) are in the top fifteen in the country.

Szeged is the higher education centre of the Southern Great Plain and has built quite a reputation for itself. Thousands of students study here, many of whom are foreigners. The University of Szeged is according to the number of students the second largest and the 4th oldest university of Hungary being established in 1581. Ranked as the top university of the country on Academic Ranking of World Universities – 2005, and in the top 100 in Europe, it offers several programs on different fields of study.

The Biological Research Centre of the Hungarian Academy of Sciences, which was built with the help of UNESCO funds, has also been a considerable source of advanced research. Scientists at this laboratory were first in the world to produce artificial heredity material in the year 2000. The building has served as a home to many well known conferences and continues to make contributions to the world of science.

The Szent-Györgyi Albert Agóra is a cultural scientific centre of Szeged which gives home to laboratories of the Biological Research Centre and to exhibitions of the John von Neumann Computer Society especially their IT historical exposition.

In 2018 the new scientific institution, the ELI Attosecond Light Pulse Source (ELI-ALPS) opened in Szeged establishing a unique facility which provides light sources within an extremely broad frequency range in the form of ultrashort pulses with high repetition rate which is needed for different kinds of physical experiments especially in the field of attosecond physics.

It is also one of the main options for medical students who come from all around Europe to study Medicine in their recognized international campus.

Demographics 

Ethnic groups (2001 census):
 Hungarians – 93.5%
 Romani – 0.7%
 Germans – 0.5%
 Serbs – 0.2%
 Romanians – 0.2%
 Croats – 0.1%
 Slovaks – 0.1%
 No answer (unknown) – 4.7%

Religions (2001 census):
 Roman Catholic – 54.5%
 Calvinist – 6.7%
 Lutheran – 1.6%
 Greek Catholic – 0.6%
 Others (Christian) – 1.3%
 Others (non-Christian) – 0.4%
 Atheist – 21.8%
 No answer (unknown) – 13.1%

Economy 

Szeged is one of the centres of food industry in Hungary, especially known for its paprika and companies like Pick Szeged, Sole-Mizo, Bonafarm etc. Other notable companies having their headquarters in Szeged are AMSY International, RRE – Szeged, Optiwella, Generál Printing House, RotaPack, Sanex Pro, Agroplanta, Karotin, Florin, Quadrotex and SZEPLAST.

Others, like ContiTech, Duna-Dráva Cement, Szatmári Malom and Europe Match, are not based in the city, but have production facilities there.

The Hangár Expo and Conference Centre provides space for international exhibitions and conferences.

Largest employers

Transport

Szeged is the most important transportation hub in the Southern Great Plain. Two motorways, M5 and M43, lie along the city border. Through the M5 Motorway Szeged is connected to Kecskemét, Kiskunfélegyháza and Budapest to the north and to Subotica, Novi Sad and Belgrade in Serbia to the south. The M43 Motorway – which splits from the M5 Motorway near Szeged – connects the city via Makó to Arad and Timișoara in Romania.  In addition, there are other roads running from the city to Makó and Nagylak (main road 43), to Röszke (main road 5), to Kiskunfélegyháza (main road 5), to Ásotthalom and Baja (main road 55) and to Hódmezővásárhely, Orosháza and Békéscsaba (main road 47).

The Budapest-Szeged-rail line is an important rail connection, as well as the railway lines 121 (to Makó), 135 (to Hódmezővásárhely), 136 (to Röszke) and 140 (to Kiskunfélegyháza).

A tram-train system was constructed and inaugurated in November 2021, connecting Szeged with the neighbouring Hódmezővásárhely, thus creating the second most populous urban agglomeration in the country, after the capital. There was a proposal for its extension, even through the Serbian border, to Subotica.

The city is also a common stop for national and international long-distance buses.

Motorways
 M5
 M43

Railways
 121 (to Makó)
 135 (to Hódmezővásárhely)
 136 (to Röszke)
 140 (to Kiskunfélegyháza).

Airport
Szeged Airport is the international airport of Szeged.

Public transport

As of May 2018 Szeged had 39 local bus lines – 15 in the city centre and 24 in the suburbs. There are also 5 tram lines.

Sport

The most popular sport in the city is handball. The city has one well-known club the 2013–14 EHF Cup-winner SC Pick Szeged playing in the Nemzeti Bajnokság I.

The second most popular sport is football in the city. Szeged had several clubs playing in the top level Hungarian league, the Nemzeti Bajnokság I. These are Szegedi AK, Szegedi Honvéd SE. The only currently operating club, Szeged 2011 play in the Nemzeti Bajnokság II.

Association football clubs
Szeged 2011, currently competing in the 2018–19 Nemzeti Bajnokság III
Szegedi Egységes Oktatási Labdarúgó SC, currently competing in the 2018–19 Nemzeti Bajnokság III
Szegedi VSE, currently competing in the Csongrád county championship
Szegedi EAC, defunct
Szegedi AK, defunct
Szegedi Honvéd SE, defunct

Main sights

Politics 
The current mayor of Szeged is László Botka (Association for Szeged).

The local Municipal Assembly, elected at the 2019 local government elections, is made up of 33 members (1 Mayor, 23 Individual constituencies MEPs and 9 Compensation List MEPs) divided into this political parties and alliances:

List of mayors
List of City Mayors from 1990:

Media

The city offers a wide range of media – television and radio stations, and print and online newspapers.

TV stations
 Szeged TV
 Tarjáni Kábeltévé Stúdió
 TiszapART TV
 Telin Televízió

Radio stations
 "Rádió 88" FM 95,4 MHz
 All in Party Radio
 Rádió Mi, 89,9 MHz
 Lánchíd Rádió, FM 100,2 MHz
 MR1 Kossuth Rádió, FM 90,3 MHz
 MR2 Petőfi Rádió, 104,6 MHz
 MR3 Bartók Rádió, 105,7 MHz
 Dankó Rádió, 93,1 MHz
 Rádió1, 87,9 MHz

Daily newspapers and news portals
 Délmagyarország

Notable people

Born in Szeged

Adrián Annus (1975), hammer thrower
Gábor Agárdy (1922–2006), actor
Béla Balázs (1884–1949), writer, poet, film critic
Zsolt Becsey (1964), politician
Joseph Csaky (1888–1971) sculptor
Krisztián Cser (1977) opera singer, physicist
Attila Czene (1974), Olympic champion medley swimmer
János Csonka (1852–1939), engineer, co-inventor of the carburetor
Mihály Erdélyi (1895–1979), operetta composer
Sophie Evans (1976), adult movie star
Ivan Fellegi (1935), Chief Statistician of Canada
Rajmund Fodor (1976), Olympic champion water polo player
Jenő Huszka (1875–1960), composer
Éva Janikovszky (1926–2003), writer
Ferenc Joachim (1882–1964), painter
Gyula Juhász (1883–1937), poet
Esther Jungreis, Orthodox Jewish outreach speaker
Judith Karasz (1912–1977), photographer and Bauhaus graduate
 (1857?), architect
Géza Maróczy (1870–1951), chess grand master
Anita Márton (1989), shot putter
Tamás Molnár (1975), Olympic champion water polo player
Nickolas Muray (born Miklós Mandl; 1892–1965), Hungarian-born American photographer and Olympic fencer
Róbert Nagy (1967), speedway rider
László Paskai (1927–2015), Archbishop of Esztergom
Szilvia Peter Szabo (1982), singer
Willy Pogany (1882–1955), illustrator
György Sebők (1922–1999), pianist
Julius Stahel (1825–1912), American Civil War general and diplomat
Hanna Tetteh (1967), Foreign minister of the Republic of Ghana
 (1983), singer
Attila Vajda (1983), Olympic champion canoer
Vilmos Zsigmond (1930), cinematographer

Lived in Szeged

Mihály Babits poet, writer
Lipót Fejér mathematician
Ferenc Fricsay conductor
Alfréd Haar mathematician
Attila József poet
László Kalmár mathematician
Dezső Kosztolányi poet, novelist
Peter Leko chess grandmaster
Immanuel Löw rabbi, Judaic scholar, politician
Leopold Löw rabbi, historian and Judaic scholar
Kálmán Mikszáth writer
Ferenc Móra writer, archaeologist
Miklós Radnóti poet
Frigyes Riesz mathematician
Albert Szent-Györgyi Nobel prize winner chemist and biologist
Béla Szőkefalvi-Nagy mathematician
Philip Wodianer communal worker
Adele Zay (1848–1928), teacher and feminist

Twin towns – sister cities

Szeged is twinned with:

 Cambridge, England, United Kingdom (1987)
 Darmstadt, Germany (1990)
 Kotor, Montenegro (2001)
 Larnaca, Cyprus (1994)
 Liège, Belgium (2001)
 Łódź, Poland (2004)
 Nice, France (1969)
 Odesa, Ukraine (1957)
 Parma, Italy (1988)
 Pula, Croatia (2003)
 Rakhiv, Ukraine (1939, renewed 1997)
 Subotica, Serbia (1966, renewed 2004)
 Târgu Mureș, Romania (1997)
 Timișoara, Romania (1998)
 Toledo, United States (1990)
 Turku, Finland (1971)
 Weinan, China (1999)

Gallery

See also
Public transport in Szeged
Szeged Symphony Orchestra
National Theatre of Szeged

Notes

References

External links

Official site with webcam 

 
County seats in Hungary
Cities with county rights of Hungary
Populated places in Csongrád-Csanád County
Roman settlements in Hungary
Serb communities in Hungary
Tourism in Hungary